Yannick Mukunzi (born 2 October 1995) is a Rwandan footballer who plays as a midfielder for Sandvikens IF and the Rwanda national football team.

He joined Sandviken on loan from Rayon Sports F.C. in 2019, and ahead of the 2020 season the move was made permanent.

International career

International goals
Scores and results list Rwanda's goal tally first.

References

External links

1995 births
Living people
Rwandan footballers
Rwanda international footballers
Association football midfielders
APR F.C. players
Rayon Sports F.C. players
Sandvikens IF players
Ettan Fotboll players
Rwandan expatriate footballers
Expatriate footballers in Sweden
Rwandan expatriate sportspeople in Sweden
Rwanda A' international footballers
2016 African Nations Championship players
2018 African Nations Championship players